TASC ("Think-tank for Action on Social Change") is a think-tank based in Dublin, Ireland.

Activities and events 

The organisation's outputs include an annual "Inequality Report"; research on tax, pay and working conditions in Ireland; development of best practices for deliberative democracy forums, and a "Toolkit for Open Government".

TASC hosts a number of events, including an annual conference which is held in association with the Brussels think tank, the Foundation for European Progressive Studies (FEPS). Former speakers at TASC events have included the social epidemiologist Richard Wilkinson, and economists Ann Pettifor and Thomas Piketty.

References

External links 
 

Think tanks based in the Republic of Ireland
Socialist think tanks
Think tanks established in 2001
Organisations based in Dublin (city)
2001 establishments in Ireland